Nuevo Morelos is a municipality located in the Mexican state of Tamaulipas.

External links
Gobierno Municipal de Nuevo Morelos Official website

Municipalities of Tamaulipas